Old lady may refer to:

Slang
 A woman at an old age
 Mother
 Girlfriend (American)
 Wife (American)

Nicknames
 Bank of England, United Kingdom's central bank
 Hertha BSC, association football club based in Berlin, Germany
 Juventus F.C., association football club based in Turin, Italy
 Anorthosis Famagusta FC, association football club based in Larnaca, Cyprus
 Old lady moth, the owlet moth Mormo maura

Other uses
 The Old Lady, a 1932 Italian film

See also
Babushka (disambiguation)
Old man (disambiguation)
Old woman (disambiguation)